Mike Hermann may refer to:
 Mike Hermann (American football)
 Mike Hermann (athletic director)